Lenore Kasdorf (born July 23, 1948) is an American actress. She is known for her role as the alluring and promiscuous nurse Rita Stapleton Bauer, whom she played from 1975 to 1981 in the soap opera Guiding Light, and for her performance as Mrs. Rico in Starship Troopers.

Early life
Kasdorf was born in New York City. Her father served in the United States Army and she attended International School Bangkok from 1963 to 1965.

Career 
She has since appeared on the soaps Santa Barbara and Days of Our Lives, as well as a number of films. She costarred with Chuck Norris in 1984's Missing in Action. She also had a recurring role on the 1990s sitcom Coach. Other television credits include guest-starring roles on Jake & The Fatman; The A-Team, Knight Rider, Murder She Wrote, Barnaby Jones, 21 Jump Street, The Six Million Dollar Man, NYPD Blue, Beverly Hills, 90210, Magnum P.I, Star Trek: The Next Generation, Streets of San Francisco, In the Heat of the Night, and Babylon 5. Her last appearance was in the 2004 film Cellular.

Personal life 
Kasdorf was married to Phil Peters from 1977 to 1983 and they have one daughter.

Filmography

Film

Television

References

External links

1948 births
American soap opera actresses
Kasdorf, Lenore
Living people
People from Queens, New York
Actresses from New York City
21st-century American women